Rao Bahadur Chinnakavanam Tadulinga Mudaliar or C. Tadulingam (1878–1954) was an Indian botanist known for his book A Handbook of Some South Indian Grasses which he penned along with K. Rangachari. The book is considered to be the first on the subject and won Mudaliar considerable acclaim. Mudaliar served as mayor of Madras in 1942-43.

Personal life 

Born in Madras Presidency, in 1878, Mudaliar graduated from the Agricultural College, Coimbatore, in which he served as a Principal in his later years.

Mudaliar wrote A Handbook on Some South Indian Grasses in 1921 along with K. Rangachari of the Government Museum, Chennai and won instant acclaim. He was elected Fellow of the Linnean Society and the "Rao Bahadur" title was conferred upon him.

Politics 

Mudaliar succeeded V. Chakkarai Chettiar as mayor of Madras city in 1942. He served till 1943 and was succeeded by Syed Niamatullah.

Death 

Mudaliar died in 1954 at the age of seventy-five.

Notes

External links 
 Tadulingam, C.; G. Venkatanarayana (1932) A Handbook of Some South Indian Weeds. Madras: Government Press.
 A handbook of some south Indian grasses (1921)

1878 births
1954 deaths
Mayors of Chennai
19th-century Indian botanists
Fellows of the Linnean Society of London
20th-century Indian botanists
Scientists from Chennai
Botanists from British India